Lucy Knight is a fictional character In the NBC television series ER, portrayed by actress Kellie Martin. The character was part of the show for the fifth and sixth seasons. When she was first introduced on ER, Dr. Doug Ross called her a "by the book" medical student. Kellie Martin's image was removed from the main cast opening credits in the 15th episode of season 6.

Conception and creation
Prior to this role in ER, Martin was nicknamed "One Take Kellie". She was not used to the medical jargon her character had to say, however, and claimed that it once took 12 takes to correctly pronounce "renal vein thrombosis."

Appearances

Season 5

During season 5 she was a third-year medical student. Dr. John Carter was quickly assigned as her resident while she completed her  emergency room rotation. Knight and Carter varied between respectful and contentious interactions.

At the beginning of her rotation at County General, she was popular with the attendings and nurses, who often treated her as another colleague. Lucy does run into trouble with Nurse Carol Hathaway after she asks for help with an IV. Lucy, unable to start an IV asks Carol for help and does not own up to Carter that she cannot start one until they end up in a trauma where she admits the truth. Carter was furious at her for lying to him and said if she ever did so again she would be off his rotation permanently, and the relationship between them was never quite the same. Lucy wound up in trouble with Carter again after a Halloween party at her med school gets out of control and two students nearly die. Angry about work that has been thrown at him at the last minute, Carter leaves Lucy in charge of the party even though, as RA, that is his responsibility. Carter blames Lucy for him losing his RA position and they fight again when Carter overrules her on a case where Lucy's judgment was correct, with Lucy then making comments on her Palm Pilot that Carter accidentally hears that describe his condescending treatment of her. Carter and Lucy eventually come to an agreement after the episode "The Good Fight" when the pair spend a day and evening searching for a little girl's father who has the same extremely rare blood type as she does.

Although the pair find the father, the girl's condition remains critical as the story ends and it is not clear whether the blood donation came in time to help save her. At the end of this episode, Carter and Lucy reconcile over the efforts they made. During this episode, Lucy reveals to Carter that she was brought up by her mother, and that she did not know her father.

During the episode The Storm: Part 1, Lucy accidentally kicks Carter while performing a work-out video with a patient in an exam room; he suffers a gash on his head. The pair later share a kiss in the x-ray room, but Carter ends their brief relationship because it is unethical for medical students and their residents to be romantically involved. Lucy's rotation in the psych department goes exceptionally well, with the senior doctors there are impressed with her successful results. This was the first time the show had a main character who started out working in the ER but was shown to be a poor match for emergency medicine and a good match instead for a different medical field (a similar, longer path was traced starting in Season 10 for Neela Rasgotra, who was an uneven ER doctor but emerged over time as a superb surgeon).

Near the end of Season 5, it is revealed that Lucy is on Ritalin and has been since high school. Carter urges her to quit and she eventually does. When her performance at County begins to suffer, Lucy goes back on the Ritalin without telling Carter, and when he finds out and chides her for it she bluntly says that she does not expect him to understand or care, since "it's clear I've never lived up to your expectations."

Season 6
Lucy's role in the early episodes of season 6 is rather small, having only minor sub plots such as helping a young artist who is using cocaine or by urging Dr. Dave Malucci to come forward and admit his possible mistake when using a Bunsen Burner that was thought to have caused an explosion in the ER.

Lucy clashed with nurse Carol Hathaway when they both make a plea for the last bed in a rehab clinic. The bed ultimately goes to Hathaway's patient, which creates renewed friction between the pair when the patient does not show up for treatment. Lucy also clashes with Dr. Cleo Finch when Finch undermines Lucy's judgment in regard to a young boy and his mother who both have alcohol abuse problems.

Lucy is finally able to come into her own and show her potential in the Christmas episode "How the Finch Stole Christmas" when patient Valerie Paige comes to the ER in desperate need of a heart transplant. Lucy goes above and beyond to ensure Valerie gets the life saving procedure - even going so far as to bang on Dr. Robert Romano's door in the middle of the night on Christmas Eve. Though initially angry with her, Romano agrees to perform the operation after Lucy berates him for his seemingly flippant attitude towards the dying patient. Though she faces a reprimand from Romano, he seems to have more respect for her from then on.

Later in the episode "The Domino Heart", Lucy is devastated when Valerie dies from complications after another surgery. This makes her ponder her time at County General and prompts her to give a moving speech to Dr. Luka Kovac about it: "It's never been very easy for me to be here, sometimes I felt like I would never fit in. But at the beginning of every day I have been grateful that I'm walking in here of my own choosing and not being carried in here on some gurney and at the end of every day if I have helped just one person, it's been worth it. And that didn't happen today and it makes me sad...". Kovac reminds her that her day is not yet over and that she may still help that one person. At that moment another patient arrives near the ambulance bay, and Kovac asks her to assist. The episode ends with the two of them rushing the patient into the ER and Kovac teaching Lucy procedures and asking her questions.

Death
In various interviews, Kellie Martin stated that she and the producers felt the character of Lucy was not working, so it was decided that Lucy would be written out of the show permanently. Martin also said that having family members face serious real-life medical issues nixed her interest in working on a medical show. On February 14, 2000, over the course of two episodes, "Be Still My Heart" and "All In The Family", Paul Sobriki (played by David Krumholtz), a man with schizophrenia, checks into the emergency room. Lucy picks up on his mental problems, but Carter refuses to help her with the case and either ignores her 100%-accurate views of Paul's state or openly scoffs at them. When she wants his help with getting the Psych Department to take a look at Paul, Carter dismissively says she should contact them and then pick up on other cases, leading her to angrily say "Just forget it, Carter!" and stop seeking his advice on the case. This was the last time they ever spoke to each other.

While in a delusional state, Paul acquires a knife that was to be used to cut a Valentine's Day cake and stabs Knight multiple times before lying in wait for Carter. When Carter enters the room and sees a Valentine for Lucy on the floor, he picks it up and looks over it smiling just as Paul emerges from the shadows and stabs him twice before fleeing. Upon glancing at his blood-stained fingers, Carter goes into shock and hits the floor, gazing in surprise at Lucy lying in a pool of blood on the other side of the gurney. Both lose consciousness.

Both are later discovered by Dr. Kerry Weaver and immediately taken to the main Trauma rooms to be treated. It is discovered that Lucy had received four serious stab wounds to her internal organs, lung, and neck. Although Weaver and Dr. Elizabeth Corday are able to stabilize Lucy in the ER, and Corday and Dr. Robert Romano are then able to repair her tissue damage, she soon develops complications, including a pulmonary embolism. Despite the heroic efforts of Doctors Corday and Romano, Lucy dies while in the catheter lab awaiting a Greenfield filter.

Lucy's memorial service takes place in the episode "Be Patient", although it is not seen on-screen and was apparently only attended by Jing-Mei Chen, who was there more as a representative of the ER than as a friend of Lucy's. That same day, Lucy's mother, Barbara Knight, arrives to clear out her locker. She eventually seeks Carter out and they spend the afternoon talking, with Mrs. Knight recounting how Lucy loved San Francisco but went to Chicago to practice medicine before she begins sobbing over her daughter's death as Carter watches silently and sadly.  Hoping to spare her the knowledge of Lucy's suffering, he lies and says he did not actually feel pain when stabbed. Carter later talks to a few characters and says Lucy was a better doctor than he gave her credit for. He also says in the Season 6 finale "May Day" that Lucy's death is "partly my fault".

In the episode "A Match Made In Heaven", a letter for Lucy arrives from a med school because she wasn't taken off their registry after she was killed. She had matched to County, and, had she lived, she would have been given a position as a psych resident.

References

External links

ER (TV series) characters
Fictional medical students
Television characters introduced in 1998
Fictional female doctors
Female characters in television
Fictional murdered people